GML may refer to:

Computing 
 Game Maker Language, the scripting language of Game Maker
 Generalized Markup Language, a set of macros for the IBM text formatter, SCRIPT
 Generative Modelling Language, an extension of PostScript used for the concise description of complex 3D shapes
 Geography Markup Language, an XML grammar to express geographical features
 Graffiti Markup Language, an XML-based file format that stores graffiti motion data
 Graph Modelling Language, a hierarchical ASCII-based file format for describing graphs

Other uses 
 Canadian Gold Maple Leaf, a gold bullion coin
 Gilmala Halt railway station (station code), in Pakistan
 GML Heritage, an Australian heritage consultancy firm
 Hostomel Airport (IATA code), in Ukraine
 Gradient multilayer nanofilm, a nanomaterial
 Grand Medal of Lotus Flower, an honour of Macau
 Guardian Media Limited, a Trinidadian media company
 Middle Low German (ISO 639-3 code), a formerly used European language
 Glycerol monolaurate, a naturally occurring antimicrobial agent